The Strangford Treaty was a treaty signed at Rio de Janeiro the 19th of February 1810 by the British and the Portuguese government, then in exile in its colony of Brazil. The treaty granted the British special commercial privileges, notably preferential tariffs of 15 percent on British goods imported into Brazil, in exchange for their defense of Portugal and its colonies during the Napoleonic War.Portugal also agreed to limit the importation of African slaves and to consider the abolition of the slave trade.

In 1785, a decree proclaimed that Brazilian factories could only produce cloth that would be used for clothing slaves or to make sacks for food goods. This decree was lifted in 1808, accompanied by an open ports policy. To help recover their internal industry, Brazil imposed Tariff protection on imports.

During this period, the British had helped the Portuguese government to flee the invading Napoleonic army and find refuge in Rio de Janeiro. The Anglo-Irish diplomat, Percy Smythe, 6th Viscount Strangford, negotiated an agreement to grant Britain trade privileges with Brazil. In return for these Brazilian concessions, the British would convince the Portuguese government to recognise Brazilian independence.

The result of the treaty was that exports from the United Kingdom came to dominate the markets in Brazil. Imported British goods would only receive a 15% duty, compared to 25% for goods from other nations. It also limited Brazilian legal recourse against British subjects and allowed British agents to become established throughout the country. As a result, low cost imported goods manufactured by machine industry began to swamp the market that had previously been dominated by the local handicrafts
industry. Exports of tobacco and sugar from Brazil were prohibited, which protected British producers in the West Indies.

The treaty was written so as to expire in 1825 unless renewed. It remained in effect until 1844.

References

Commercial treaties
1810 treaties
Treaties of the United Kingdom (1801–1922)
Treaties of the Kingdom of Portugal
Brazil–United Kingdom relations